This is a list of castles in Malta.

Castle-like palaces and towers

A number of towers, palaces and other buildings built in Malta after the medieval period are sometimes referred to as castles. These include the 16th-century Verdala Palace, the 18th-century Selmun Palace, the 19th-century Zammitello Palace and the 20th-century Castello Dei Baroni. Most of these were not actually fortified and were not built to withstand an attack, although the Verdala Palace was armed with artillery pieces.

Other buildings claimed as castles in Malta include: Bubaqra Tower (Zurrieq), Castel Qannotta (Wardija), Chateaux Bertrand (destroyed - Ta’ Qali), a number of baronial buildings and wedding venues.

See also
List of fortifications in Malta

References

Malta
Castles
Malta
Castles